Güzeltepe can refer to:

 Güzeltepe, Bayramiç
 Güzeltepe, Söke